Removable heel is a concept that allows the wearer to easily change heels of a shoe during the day in order to change height, color or shape of the heel.

Reducing heel height might lessen pain and the health effects of high-heels.

History

Removable heels were first imagined in 1956 by French shoe designer André Perugia

After 2010, several brands succeeded in manufacturing and selling removable heel footwear, including Tanya Heath Paris.

References

Shoemaking